Rhadinematidae is a family of nematodes belonging to the order Leptolaimida.

Genera:
 Cricolaimus Southern, 1914
 Lavareda da Fonseca-Genevois, Smol & Bezerra, 2011
 Rhadinema Cobb, 1920

References

Nematodes